Maxim Alexeyevich Antonovich (9 May 1835, – 14 November 1918) was a Russian literary critic, essayist, memoirist, translator and philosopher.

Biography
Maxim Antonovich was born in Belopolye, Sumskoy Uyezd, Kharkov Governorate, to the family of a clergyman. After studying at the Kharkiv seminary he enrolled in the Saint Petersburg Theological Academy which he graduated in 1859.

Antonovich's literary career started in Sovremennik where several articles promoting the philosophy of materialism brought him the reputation of an "ideological heir to Chernyshevsky." As a head of the magazine's literary criticism department (a position he took after Nikolai Dobrolyubov's death) Antonovich waged bitter feuds against Vremya, Epokha, and later Russkoye Slovo, after his slagging of Ivan Turgenev's Fathers and Sons in 1862 outraged Dmitry Pisarev and a violent confrontation ensued which Fyodor Dostoyevsky called "the break-up of the Russian nihilism."

As Nekrasov refused Antonovich an invitation to the renewed Otechestvennye Zapiski in 1869, he accused the former in "betrayal of the old friends" and turned to translation work (Histoire de la Revolution Française by Louis Blanc, Physics by Balfour Stewart, The Teaching of Geography by Archibald Geikie, Textbook of Physiology by Michael Foster, among others). In 1898—1916 he published memoirs on Nikolai Dobrolyubov, Nikolai Chernyshevsky, Nikolai Nekrasov and Pyotr Lavrov. Antonovich died on 14 November 1918 in Petrograd, Soviet Russia.

References 

1835 births
1918 deaths
People from Sumy Oblast
People from Sumsky Uyezd
19th-century essayists
19th-century translators from the Russian Empire
19th-century male writers from the Russian Empire
Literary critics from the Russian Empire
Russian male essayists
Russian memoirists
Russian nihilists
Russian philosophers